Julian Allen Hykes (born 6 October 1982) is a former South African field hockey player. At the 2012 Summer Olympics, he competed for the national team in the men's tournament. After the 2018 World Cup he retired from the national team. He was also a cricketer, playing in two List A matches for Border in 2009.

See also
 List of Border representative cricketers

References

External links
 
 

1982 births
Living people
South African male field hockey players
Olympic field hockey players of South Africa
2010 Men's Hockey World Cup players
Field hockey players at the 2012 Summer Olympics
2014 Men's Hockey World Cup players
Field hockey players at the 2014 Commonwealth Games
2018 Men's Hockey World Cup players
Commonwealth Games competitors for South Africa
Place of birth missing (living people)
South African cricketers
Border cricketers
21st-century South African people